The North Carolina Court of Appeals (in case citation, N.C. Ct. App.) is the only intermediate appellate court in the state of North Carolina. It is composed of fifteen members who sit in rotating panels of three. The Court of Appeals was created by the North Carolina General Assembly in 1967 after voters approved a constitutional amendment in 1965 which "authorized the creation of an intermediate court of appeals to relieve pressure on the North Carolina Supreme Court."

Judges serve eight-year terms and are elected in statewide elections. The General Assembly made Court of Appeals elections non-partisan starting with the 2004 elections, but later made them partisan again after the 2016 elections.

Current judges

There are currently 11 Republicans and 4 Democrats.

Notes:

Former judges
A partial list of former judges is listed below:

 Lucy Inman
 Darren Jackson
 Christopher Brook
 Wanda Bryant
 Linda McGee
 Reuben Young
 Mark A. Davis
 Ann Marie Calabria
 Rick Elmore
 Douglas McCullough
 Linda Stephens
 Wendy Enochs
 Martha A. Geer
 Sanford L. Steelman Jr.
 Lisa Bell
 Sam Ervin, IV
 Robert C. Hunter
 Robert N. Hunter Jr.
 John C. Martin
 Cressie Thigpen
 Cheri Beasley
 Barbara Jackson
 James A. Wynn Jr.
 Eric L. Levinson
 Hugh Brown Campbell Jr.
 Robin E. Hudson
 Patricia Timmons-Goodson
 Loretta Copeland Biggs
 Robert H. Edmunds Jr.
 Mark Martin
 Sarah Parker
 Alan Z. Thornburg
 Robert F. Orr
 John Webb
 Jack L. Cozort
 John B. Lewis Jr.
 Ralph A. Walker
 Sidney S. Eagles Jr.
 Joe John
 S. Gerald Arnold
 Donald L. Smith
 Allyson Kay Duncan
 Burley Mitchell
 Clifton E. Johnson
 Willis Whichard
 Charles Becton
 Richard Erwin
 Robert M. Martin
 Fred Hedrick
 James M. Baley Jr.
 Walter E. Brock
 David M. Britt
 James C. Farthing
 Naomi E. Morris
 Raymond B. Mallard
 Hugh B. Campbell
 Francis M. Parker
 Earl W. Vaughn

See also
 North Carolina Supreme Court

References

External links
 Official site

North Carolina state courts
State appellate courts of the United States
1967 establishments in North Carolina
Courts and tribunals established in 1967